Tarde lo conocí (stylized as Tarde lo conocí, cuando las mujeres callaban, ella cantó), is a Colombian biographical television series produced by CMO Producciones for Caracol Televisión. Based on the life of the composer and singer Patricia Teherán. It stars María Elisa Camargo in the main role.

Plot 
It is based on the life of Patricia Teherán (María Elisa Camargo) who because of her taste for music vallenata decided to dedicate her life to make her way in this world using as tools her optimism, joy, sympathy and desire to get her family from the harsh economic conditions for that they crossed; but because this world was considered exclusive for men, Patricia had to face many adversities to achieve her goal. Throughout her career as a singer, this woman meets a man named Ricardo Cabello (Roberto Urbina) with whom he maintains a loving relationship, not knowing that he was committed to Sonia Maestre and after learning of this disastrous news Patricia looks for a way to convey her feelings to through its interpretation; thanks to the help given by Héctor Méndez (Javier Jattin); who after having met her fell in love with her and after learning what Ricardo did, he does everything possible to keep her away from him, becoming his unconditional company at all times of his life.

Cast

Main 
 María Elisa Camargo as Patricia Teherán
 Roberto Urbina as Ricardo Cabello
 Javier Jattin as Héctor Méndez
 Luna Baxter as Sonia Maestre
 Víctor Hugo Trespalacios as Juancho Teherán
 Jacqueline Arenal as Margot Romero
 Mimi Anaya as Caya Quiros 
 Gianina Arana as Ingrid Cubides 
 Sharlyn Bayter as Matilde
 Megumi Hasebe as Yulitza 
 Constanza Duque as Cate
 Marcela Agudelo as Pau
 Carlos Serrato as Remberto Infante
 Laura Ramos as Estrella
 Brenda Hanst as Francisca
 Juan Pablo Franco as Emiliano Maestre
 Jacques Tourhmanian as Jair Villanueva
 Federico Rivera as Orlando
 Pedro Palacio as César
 Andrés Ruiz as Mauricio Cabello
 Alberoni Cortés as Kike
 Jeferson Medina as Alejo
 Juan Diego Sánchez as Cabeto
 Rafael Santos Díaz as El Cacique

Ratings

Awards and nominations

References

External links 
 

Colombian telenovelas
Spanish-language telenovelas
Caracol Televisión telenovelas
Television series based on singers and musicians
2017 Colombian television series debuts
2017 telenovelas
2018 Colombian television series endings
Television shows set in Colombia